Pancar railway station is a railway station in Pancar, Turkey along the Southern Line of the İZBAN commuter rail system. It is also serviced by regional trains operating out of Basmane Terminal in Izmir to destinations south.

The station was built in 1860 by the Oriental Railway Company and taken over by the Turkish State Railways in 1935. Between 2015 and 2016 it was rebuilt and expanded to accommodate the extension of the Southern Line to Tepeköy.

Bus connections
ESHOT
701 Torbalı-Tekeli
704 Pancar Aktarma - Yazıbaşı Toplu Konutları706 Pancar Aktarma - Ayrancılar707 Pancar Aktarma - Menderes709 Pancar Aktarma - Demirci''

References

Railway stations in İzmir Province
Railway stations opened in 1860
1860 establishments in the Ottoman Empire
Torbalı District